The 1997 Canoe Marathon European Championships were the second edition of the Canoe Marathon European Championships, which took place on 13–14 September 1997 in Pavia, Italy.  The competition consisted of six events, four in kayak (men and women's K-1 and K-2) and two in canoe (men's C-1 and C-2), all of which were contested in a distance of 36 kilometers.

Medal overview

Medalists

Medal table

References

Canoe Marathon European Championships
Canoe Marathon European Championships
Canoe Marathon European Championships
International sports competitions hosted by Italy
Marathon European Championships
Canoeing and kayaking competitions in Italy